Md. Faizur Rahman SGP, BSP, ndc, afwc, psc is a major general in the Bangladesh Army and 28th Commandant of Defence Services Command and Staff College (DSCSC). Prior to join here, he was GOC of the 66 Infantry Division, Bangladesh Army & Area Commander, Rangpur Area.

Career 
Faizur was commissioned in Bangladesh Army on 21 December 1990 with 23rd BMA Long Course. He was appointed at Khagrachari of CHT before promoting to Major General. He served as Commander of 203 Infantry Khagrachhari Army Region as Brigadier General. He was Senior Instructor (SI) and Faculty Member of Defence Services Command and Staff College (DSCSC) and Directing Staff and Faculty Member of War Course at NDC. During his tenure as GOC, 66 Infantry Division arranged and conducted the exercise on Swarna Dwip in Noakhali name "Joint Manoeuvre Exercise-2022". Rahman also the Chairman of Bangladesh Army University of Science and Technology (BAUST), Saidpur as an ex-officio.

References 

Bangladeshi generals
Bangladeshi military personnel
Living people
Bangladesh Army generals
Year of birth missing (living people)